Donald's Happy Birthday is a 1949 Donald Duck cartoon featuring Donald Duck and his nephews Huey, Dewey, and Louie. In the short film,  Huey, Dewey, and Louie would like to buy a box of cigars for Donald's birthday but Donald decides to keep the money.

Plot
On March 13, Huey, Dewey, and Louie decide to buy a box of cigars for their uncle Donald's birthday, but when they realize they do not have $2.98 ($34.18 in current time), they do chores for Donald's backyard lawn and charge Donald for the chores. He happily gives them the money, but then immediately has them deposit it in a coin bank as they try to leave the house. After a couple of failed attempts to steal the bank from Donald, the triplets manage to take the money and buy the box of cigars before returning to their tree house.

However, Donald spotted the trio purchasing the cigar box from the store, and mistakenly believes that the trio has taken up smoking in secret. A furious Donald then punishes the trio by making them smoke all of the cigars themselves to teach them a lesson about smoking, and the triplets end up passing out due to smoke inhalation. Just as the cigar box is emptied, Donald discovers a birthday card written by the trio inside the box, making him realize that the triplets were actually going to give the cigars to him as a birthday present. Horrified of what he has done to the triplets, Donald shrinks out of shame and jumps into a hole in the tree house floor.

Voice cast
 Clarence Nash as Donald Duck, Huey, Dewey, and Louie

Home media
The short was released on December 11, 2007, on Walt Disney Treasures: The Chronological Donald, Volume Three: 1947-1950.

References

External links

1949 films
1949 animated films
Donald Duck short films
1940s Disney animated short films
Films about birthdays
Films about smoking
Films scored by Oliver Wallace
Films directed by Jack Hannah
Films produced by Walt Disney
1940s English-language films